An octose is a monosaccharide containing eight carbon atoms.  Lincomycin contains the octose methylthiolincosamide.

See also
 Heptose
 Hexose
 Pentose

References

Monosaccharides